Cedarville is a hamlet located on NY 51 in the Town of Columbia in Herkimer County, New York, United States. Steele Creek flows northward through the hamlet.

References

Hamlets in Herkimer County, New York
Hamlets in New York (state)